Telephone numbers in Israel consist of an area code and a subscriber number. The dial plan type in Israel is closed, and "0" is the internal Trunk prefix in Israel. Israel's country calling code is +972.

When dialing an Israeli number from inside of Israel, the format is :
"0 - Area/network operator code (A/N) - subscriber number (X)"

When dialing an Israeli number from outside Israel, the format is :
"+972 - Area/network operator code (A/N) - subscriber number (X)"

The Israeli telecommunication infrastructure includes the Palestinian telecommunication system.

History

In 1965, many Israeli phone numbers had 6 digits, but some had 5, according to the Tel Aviv-area phone book.  There were ten area codes at that time: 02 Jerusalem, Bet Shemesh; 03 Tel Aviv, Petah Tikva, Rehovot, Ashdod; 04 Haifa and western Galilee; 051 Ashkelon; 053 Netanya; 057 Beersheva and most of the Negev; 059 Eilat; 065 Afula, Nazareth; 063 Hadera, Zichron Yaakov; and 067 Tiberias, Zefat and eastern Galilee.

As recently as the 1990s, most telephone numbers in Israel had 6 digits (without area code digit). Currently there are 5 geographic area codes and 2 more non-geographic area codes, and numbers has 7 or 8 digits (without area code digit).

Structure and format
The format for calls to landlines within the same area code is XXX-XXXX (7 digits subscriber number). For calls to a landline outside the local area, the area code is prefixed and the format becomes (0A) XXX-XXXX for calls to landlines, where "0A" is the area code.

The format for calls to cellular mobile phones is 05N-XXX-XXXX, where "05N" is the mobile operator indicator. The format for calls to VoIP lines is 07N-XXX-XXXX, where "07N" is the VoIP operator indicator.

When calling from outside of Israel, the leading "0" in area codes is not dialed, and the format is +972-A-XXX-XXXX for calls to landlines, +972-5N-XXX-XXXX for calls to mobile lines, +972-7N-XXX-XXXX for calls to VoIP lines.

International call prefix
For calling from Israel to another country: choose operator, and dial its international access code, then dial destination country code and then the rest of the local number.
00 or + – short code (only registered customers)
012 – 012smile service
013 – 013 NetVision service
014 – Bezeq International service
015 – Hallo 015 service
016 – Golan Telecom service
017 – Hot Mobile service
018 – Xfone service
019 – 019 Telzar service

Area codes

Due to mobile number portability, a mobile phone with a prefix of one provider can be associated with a different provider.

Geographic area codes

When dialing within one of the geographical area codes (2, 3, 4, 8, 9) the prefix can be dropped (so instead of dialing (0A)XXX-XXXX you can dial XXX-XXXX).

 In the geographic area codes, first digits of the local number are identifying service operator:

Cellular and mobile devices area code 05

Non-geographic nationwide area code 07 
Non-geographic nationwide area code can be used by Landline and VoIP operators.

Special numbers
Special numbers include emergency and aid services, along with technical support and other provider services:

 100 - Police
 101 - Ambulance Service
 102 - Fire Fighters
 103 - Electric Corporation
 104 - Home Front Command (Information about how to act in war and earthquake)
 105 - Child Online Protection Bureau
 106 - Municipal Call Center <in most cities>
 107 - Municipal Call Center <in some cities>
 108 - Municipal Call Center <in some cities>
 109 - Municipal Call Center <in some cities>
 110 - Police information service
 118 - Ministry of Social Affairs emergency service
 1201 - Mental health first aid
 1221 - Emergency Medical Response
 1230 - Emergency Non-Medical Response
 1255 XXX - Hospital Information Center <only in times of emergency>
 *XXXX - (Star and 4 digits) Speed dial service
 1234 - Bezeq-Card service (Bezeq lines only)
 1455 - Speaking clock - Time and date in Israel and around the world
 142 - Collect Call
 144 - Telephone Listings Information
 166 - Bezeq technical support
 171 - Israel Post Office
 199 - Bezeq customer service
 164 - Bezeq business customer service
 1 599 XXX XXX - Business Toll
 1 700 XXX XXX - Business Toll
 1 80X XXX XXX - Toll Free
 1 90X XXX XXX - Premium

Kosher numbers
 
Kosher phones and networks are essentially phones with Haredi rabbinical approval that can be used for communication without entertainment functionality or connectivity. This is a line that has a pre-defined
prefix and it is blocked to content that Haredi activists feel is not appropriate for their community.
Such blocking includes cellular internet access, chat rooms, SMS, etc.
This does not mean that other phones are not kosher according to Jewish law, as evidenced by the fact that a very large number - if not the majority - of observant Orthodox Jews worldwide do not restrict themselves to "kosher" phones; rather the description "kosher" phones is a loose one, implying an added level of stringency accepted by some communities.

The companies who provides "kosher numbers" allocated exclusive ranges for those lines, which are:
 +972 (A) 80X-XXXX - Bezeq (When A = 2,3,4,8,9)
 +972 50 41X-XXXX  - Pelephone
 +972 52 71X-XXXX  - Cellcom, second range
 +972 52 76X-XXXX  - Cellcom, first range
 +972 53 31X-XXXX  - Hot Mobile, first range
 +972 53 41X-XXXX  - Hot Mobile, second range
 +972 54 84X-XXXX  - Partner, first range
 +972 54 85X-XXXX  - Partner, second range
 +972 55 67X-XXXX  - Rami Levy
 +972 55 71X-XXXX  - Cellact
 +972 55 98X-XXXX  - 019 Telzar
 +972 58 32X-XXXX  - Golan Telecom
 +972 72 29X-XXXX  - Partner (012smile)
 +972 73 724-XXXX  - Veidan

See also
Telephone numbers in the Palestinian territories

References

External links
Israel Ministry of Communication
Presentation of E.164 National Numbering For Country Code 972 (Israel), Update August 2007, Israel Ministry of Communication
Israel Ministry of Communications numbering program 
Shortened business numbers (star numbers) at the Israel Ministry of Communications 
Change of 057 prefix to 053 

Israel
Telecommunications in Israel
Israel communications-related lists